Nevins is an unincorporated community in Edgar County, Illinois, United States.

Notes

Unincorporated communities in Edgar County, Illinois
Unincorporated communities in Illinois